The Challenge 67 is a steel-hulled yacht. There were 14 of these yachts built, for the purpose of racing in the BT Global Challenge.

The yachts were designed by David Thomas and Thanos Condylis, and built by Devonport Management Limited.

Specifications 

 Mast Height     -    85 ft 3in    (25.98m)
 Sail Area Upwind   - 2454sq ft   (228sq m)
 Sail Area Downwind - 4754sq ft   (441sq m)
 Overall length   -   67'    (20.42m)
 Beam          -      17 ft 3in    (5.26m)
 Draught       -      9 ft 6in   (2.82m)
 Displacement    -    40 tons
 Hull             -   50B mild steel
 Deck              -  316 Stainless steel
 Keel weight        - 12 Tons
 Engine           -   Perkins 130HP
 Generator         -  Perkins 27HP
 Fuel         -       385 Gallons (1600 litres)
 Water         -      242 Gallons (1100 litres)
 Berths         -     14 in six cabins

References

Sailing yachts
1990s sailboat type designs